John Letts may refer to:
John Letts (publisher) (1929–2006), English publisher, who founded the British Empire and Commonwealth Museum
John Letts (stationary publisher) (mid-1700s), English stationary producer, who founded Letts of London in 1796
John Spencer Letts (1934–2014), U.S. federal judge
John Letts (jockey) (born 1943), former Australian jockey
John Letts (tennis) (born 1964), former professional tennis player from the United States
John Letts (RAF officer) (1897–1918), World War I flying ace in No. 48 Squadron RAF